Christopher "Chris" James Mullins, OAM (born 23 November 1986)  is an Australian Paralympic cerebral palsy track and field athlete. He won a gold medal and broke the world record at the 2008 Beijing Games in the Men's 4 × 100 m T35-38 event, for which he received a Medal of the Order of Australia.

Personal life
Mullins completed a Bachelor of Nursing degree in 2010 at La Trobe University. He is currently working as a registered nurse at the Royal Melbourne Hospital. One of Mullins' great passions is the Essendon Football Club.

References

Paralympic athletes of Australia
Athletes (track and field) at the 2008 Summer Paralympics
Paralympic gold medalists for Australia
Recipients of the Medal of the Order of Australia
Cerebral Palsy category Paralympic competitors
Living people
1986 births
Medalists at the 2008 Summer Paralympics
Paralympic medalists in athletics (track and field)
Australian male sprinters
Athletes from Melbourne